Tiberiu Popoviciu (February 16, 1906–October 29, 1975) was a Romanian mathematician and the namesake of Popoviciu's inequality and Popoviciu's inequality on variances.

The Tiberiu Popoviciu High School of Computer Science in Cluj-Napoca is named after him.

In 1951 he founded a research institute which now bears his name: Tiberiu Popoviciu Institute of Numerical Analysis.

Biography

Popoviciu was born in Arad in 1906, and attended high school in his hometown, the school which is now the Moise Nicoară National College. He graduated from the University of Bucharest, and got his doctorate in 1933 under Paul Montel from Paris-Sorbonne University.

He was a lecturer at the Universities of Cernăuți, Bucharest, and Iași. In 1946 he was appointed professor at the University of Cluj. On June 4, 1937 Popoviciu was elected member of the Romanian Academy. In November 1948 he was elected corresponding member of the Academy. He became full member of the mathematical sciences section of the Academy on March 20, 1963.

He married his former student, Elena Moldovan Popoviciu, in 1964; she also became a notable functional analyst. He died in 1975 in Cluj-Napoca, and is buried in the city's Hajongard Cemetery.

References

1906 births
1975 deaths
People from Arad, Romania
Romanian Austro-Hungarians
20th-century Romanian mathematicians
Titular members of the Romanian Academy
Members of the Romanian Academy of Sciences
Paris-Sorbonne University alumni
University of Bucharest alumni
Academic staff of the University of Bucharest
Academic staff of Chernivtsi University
Academic staff of Alexandru Ioan Cuza University
Academic staff of Babeș-Bolyai University
Numerical analysts